Wally Maher (August 4, 1908 – December 26, 1951) was an American actor, primarily on old-time radio; he was also known as the original voice of Tex Avery's cartoon character Screwy Squirrel.

Early years 
Maher was born in Cincinnati on August 4, 1908. He was the son of Daniel and Mary Maher, and he had three brothers and two sisters. He dropped out of high school to pursue a career in acting.

Career

Theater 
Maher gained early acting experience with a stock theater company in Cincinnati. His radio debut came when he portrayed Paul Baumer in a production of All Quiet on the Western Front. However, a lack of future acting opportunities led him to pray for divine guidance, and soon after he had another acting opportunity.

On Broadway, Maher portrayed Rittenhoff in Every Man for Himself (1940).

Radio 
In 1936, he began working on several radio dramas from the West Coast. That same year he had one of his most prominent film performances as the reporter who films the mob attempting to lynch Spencer Tracy's character in MGM's Fury, directed by Fritz Lang.

Other radio programs on which he appeared included The Whistler, NBC Presents: Short Story, The Eddie Bracken Show, Camel Caravan, Gang Busters, Suspense, Mr. District Attorney, Hollywood Showcase, I Love a Mystery, and Junior Miss.

Maher held offices in the Los Angeles chapter of the American Federation of Radio Artists, including being third vice-president in 1943 and a member of the board in 1945.

Films 
The motion pictures in which he appeared include Nick Carter, Master Detective (1950), Pound Foolish (1940), The Story of Molly X (1949), Right Cross (1950, and Mystery Street (1950).

Recording career 
In 1951, Maher and Gene Autry recorded The Story of Little Champ, a two-record album about a young colt.

Animated shorts 
Maher provided the voice of Tex Avery's cartoon character Screwy Squirrel for five shorts produced at Metro-Goldwyn-Mayer, Screwball Squirrel, Happy-Go-Nutty, Big Heel-Watha (all 1944), The Screwy Truant (1945), and Lonesome Lenny (1946). He also voiced the Jimmy Durante-sounding turkey in Jerky Turkey (1945).

Personal life and death 
Maher married Carmella Bruno, and they had a son and two daughters. Maher died on December 26, 1951, in St. Vincent's Hospital, aged 43.

References 

1908 births
1951 deaths
Male actors from Cincinnati
American male film actors
American male radio actors
American male stage actors
Broadway theatre people
Metro-Goldwyn-Mayer cartoon studio people